Man Ma-kauk  is a village in Bhamo Township in Bhamo District in the Kachin State of north-eastern Burma.

References

External links
Satellite map at Maplandia.com

Populated places in Kachin State
Bhamo Township